{{Infobox person
| honorific_prefix   = 
| name               = Muneeb Butt
| honorific_suffix   = 
| alt                = 
| caption            = Butt posing wearing Emraan Rajput
| native_name        = 
| native_name_lang   = 
| pronunciation      = 
| birth_name         = 
| birth_date         = 
| birth_place        = Karachi, Sindh Pakistan
| other_names        = 
| citizenship        = Pakistani
| education          = BS in media studies
| alma_mater         = Iqra University
| occupation         = Actor and Model
| years_active       = 2011–present
| relatives          = Minal Khan (sister-in-law)
| known_for          = 
| notable_works      = Kaisa Hai NaseebanKoi Chand RakhSilsilayYaariyanBaandi
| spouse             = 
| partner            = 
| children           = 1
}}

Muneeb Butt is a Pakistani actor who works in Urdu cinema and television. He started acting in 2012 and since then appeared in many notable television serials. His recent appearances include Daldal (2017), Baandi (2018), Koi Chand Rakh (2018), Kaisa Hai Naseeban (2019), Yaariyan (2019), Qarar (2020) and Baddua (2021).

Life and career
He was born into a Kashmiri family in Karachi, and has two siblings, a brother and a sister. He got a BS degree in media studies. After working as a commercial model for many well-known brands for several years, he made his acting debut on TV in 2012, with drama serial called Baandi which aired on ARY Digital.

Butt was engaged to actress Aiman Khan  with whom he has worked in serials Bay Qasoor (2015), Googly Muhalla (2015), Khatoon Manzil (2015) Khwab Saraye (2016) and Baandi'' (2018). The couple got married in November 2018. The couple had a baby in 2019.

Filmography

Television

Telefilms

Films

Awards and nominations

References

External links

Living people
21st-century Pakistani male actors
Pakistani male television actors
Pakistani male film actors
Male actors from Karachi
Pakistani male models
Kashmiri male models
Pakistani people of Kashmiri descent
1992 births